Komba Rural LLG (formerly Seko Rural LLG) is a local-level government (LLG) of Morobe Province, Papua New Guinea.

Wards
01. Zangang
02. Taknawe
03. Malandum
04. Mangam
05. Nakambuk
06. Somboru
07. Satwak
08. Langa
09. Saune/Kopa
10. Waran
11. Indagen
12. Musep
13. Geraun
14. Konge
15. Ununu
16. Sikam
17. Kambuk
18. Sape
19. Gumum

References

Local-level governments of Morobe Province